Gregory Magarshak (born April 6, 1985) is an American musician.

Biography

Gregory Magarshak was born in St. Petersburg, Russia and moved to the United States when he was one year old. Introduced by his mother to the piano when he was three years old, he has had a career as a child musician until his mid-teens. At 7, he became the youngest pianist to enter the Juilliard school on a scholarship. In subsequent years, he performed classical music concerts around the USA (including Carnegie Hall and Alice Tully Hall in New York), being featured on CNN, Entertainment Tonight, Eyewitness News and a PBS special entitled A Musical Encounter, and performing abroad in the Middle East.

References

Living people
Musicians from Saint Petersburg
Musicians from Brooklyn
American classical pianists
Male classical pianists
American male pianists
Russian emigrants to the United States
21st-century classical pianists
21st-century American male musicians
21st-century American pianists
Year of birth missing (living people)